Curite is a lead uranium oxide mineral with formula: Pb3(UO2)8O8(OH)6·3(H2O). It is named after the physicists Marie and Pierre Curie, who are both known for their work on radioactivity. The type locality is the	Shinkolobwe Mine.

References

Lead minerals
Oxide minerals
Uranium(VI) minerals
Orthorhombic minerals
Minerals in space group 62